Belavah Tareh or Balavah Tareh may refer to:
 Belavah Tareh-ye Olya
 Belavah Tareh-ye Sofla